Dehshal Rural District is a rural district (dehestan) in the Central District of Astaneh-ye Ashrafiyeh County, Gilan Province, Iran. At the 2006 census, its population was 9,125, in 2,783 families. The rural district has 17 villages.

References 

Rural Districts of Gilan Province
Astaneh-ye Ashrafiyeh County